Kwiek is a Polish surname. Notable people with the surname include:
Aleksander Kwiek (born 1983), Polish footballer
Dawid Kwiek (born 1988), Polish-Canadian footballer
Janusz Kwiek, crowned as Janos I, King of the Gypsies, in 1937
Julian Kwiek, Polish historian
Marcos Kwiek (born 1967), Brazilian volleyball coach
Pawel Kwiek (born 1951), Polish cinematographer

Polish-language surnames
Occupational surnames